Stan Thomas (born October 28, 1968) is a former professional American football player who played offensive tackle in the National Football League (NFL) for four seasons for the Chicago Bears and Houston Oilers from 1991 to 1994.

References

1968 births
Living people
Sportspeople from California
American football offensive tackles
Chicago Bears players
Houston Oilers players
Texas Longhorns football players